Ask Me Anything is the second studio album by New Zealand singer-songwriter Jamie McDell. It was released 27 March 2015.

Singles
 "Dumb" was released on 8 August 2014. It peaked at number 37 on the New Zealand singles chart.
 "Crash" was released on 1 January 2015. It was also released as an EP which included acoustic and instrumental versions of the track, as well as the song "Imagination".
 "Back of My Mind" was released on 27 February 2015. The song feature vocals and guitar by Rai Thistlethwayte. McDell and Thistlethwayte performed the song live on the Week 2 elimination episode of The X Factor NZ.

Track listing

Charts

References

Jamie McDell albums
2015 albums